Lyn Thomas (born Jacqueline Thomas; 1929–2004) was an American stage, television and film actress.

Thomas's first name was changed from Jacqueline to Lyn by a studio executive. Her film debut came in 1947.

Filmography

Selected Television

References

Bibliography
 Bernard A. Drew. Motion Picture Series and Sequels: A Reference Guide. Routledge, 2013.

External links
 

1929 births
2004 deaths
20th-century American actresses
American film actresses
American stage actresses
American television actresses
Actors from Fort Wayne, Indiana
21st-century American women